Stephen Gravesend was a medieval Bishop of London.

Gravesend was elected 1 September 1318 and consecrated on 14 January 1319. He died on 8 April 1338.

Gravesend, along with Archbishop Melton, John Ross and Hamo Hethe, alone spoke up in Edward II's defence during the Parliamentary session that deposed Edward.

Citations

References

 
 Weir, Alison Queen Isabella: Treachery, Adultery and Murder in Medieval England New York: Ballantine 2005

External links

 

Bishops of London
1338 deaths
Year of birth unknown
14th-century English Roman Catholic bishops